The Churchmen's Committee for Decent Publications was a Protestant pro-censorship, anti-pornography advocacy group in the United States. It was a contemporary of the Roman Catholic National Organization for Decent Literature and the National Legion of Decency.

References 

Book censorship in the United States
Christian organizations based in the United States
Censorship of pornography
Conservative organizations in the United States